Phù Yên is a township and capital of Phù Yên District in Sơn La Province, Vietnam.

References

Populated places in Sơn La province
District capitals in Vietnam
Townships in Vietnam